Joseph William Holmes (July 4, 1842 – after 1904) was a farmer and politician in Ontario, Canada. He represented Haldimand in the Legislative Assembly of Ontario from 1898 to 1904 as a Liberal.

The son of William Holmes and Mary Hoover, he was born in Selkirt, Canada West. Holmes served nine years as reeve of Rainham township and ten years as reeve of Walpole township. He also served on the council for Haldimand County.

References

External links

1842 births
Year of death missing
Ontario Liberal Party MPPs